Term of Trial is a 1962 British drama film written and directed by Peter Glenville and produced by James Woolf for his Romulus Films company, with James H. Ware as associate producer. Its screenplay was based on the 1961 novel of the same name by James Barlow. The music score was by Jean-Michel Damase and the cinematography by Oswald Morris.

The film stars Laurence Olivier, Simone Signoret, Sarah Miles, Terence Stamp, Hugh Griffith, Roland Culver, Dudley Foster and Thora Hird. The film marked the screen debuts of Miles and Stamp.

The film had its world premiere on 16 August 1962 at the Warner Theatre in London's West End.

Plot
Graham Weir is a schoolteacher whose criminal record for refusing to fight during World War II has prevented him from progressing further in his teaching career. Now, years later, he is married to a very embittered wife and is a teacher in a school with many disaffected pupils. His sincere interest in his pupils' progress leads him to get involved in their personal situations. His particular attention to Shirley Taylor, a student who develops a crush on him, leads him into serious trouble.

Cast
 Laurence Olivier as Graham Weir 
 Simone Signoret as Anna 
 Sarah Miles as Shirley Taylor 
 Terence Stamp as Mitchell 
 Hugh Griffith as O'Hara 
 Roland Culver as Trowman 
 Dudley Foster as Detective Sergeant Keirnan 
 Frank Pettingell as Ferguson 
 Thora Hird as Mrs. Taylor 
 Norman Bird as Mr. Taylor 
 Allan Cuthbertson as Sylvan-Jones 
 Barbara Ferris as Joan 
 Rosamund Greenwood as Constance
 Nicholas Hannen as Magistrate 
 Derren Nesbitt as Lodger

Production
The ingenue part was offered to Hayley Mills whose parents refused to let her do it.

References

External links
 
 

1962 films
1962 drama films
British drama films
British black-and-white films
Films about educators
Films based on British novels
British courtroom films
Films directed by Peter Glenville
1960s English-language films
1960s British films